Pilea myriophylla is a species of plant in the family Urticaceae. It is endemic to Ecuador.  Its natural habitats are subtropical or tropical dry shrubland and subtropical or tropical high-altitude grassland.

References

Endemic flora of Ecuador
myriophylla
Vulnerable plants
Taxonomy articles created by Polbot